Stinking Point is a cape in the U.S. states of Maryland and Virginia.

Stinking Point was named after the bodies of the Civil War dead washing up there.

References

Landforms of St. Mary's County, Maryland
Landforms of Westmoreland County, Virginia
Headlands of Virginia